Pavel Osipovich Sukhoi (Paviel Vosipavič Suchi; 2 July 1895 – 15 September 1975) was a Soviet aerospace engineer and aircraft designer known as the founder of the Sukhoi Design Bureau. Sukhoi designed military aircraft with Tupolev and Sukhoi for 50 years, and produced many notable Soviet planes such as the Sukhoi Su-7, Su-17, and Su-24. His planes set two altitude world records (1959, 1962) and two world speed records (1960, 1962). Sukhoi was honored in the Soviet Union as a Hero of Socialist Labor and awarded the Order of Lenin three times.

Biography
Pavel Osipovich Sukhoi was born 22 July 1895 in Hlybokaye, Vilna Governorate of the Russian Empire, to ethnic Belarusian parents of peasant background. He had five sisters and no brothers. In 1900, Sukhoi's family moved to Gomel when his father, Osip Andreevich Sukhoi, got a job as a teacher at a school for the children of railway workers. From 1905 to 1914, Sukhoi attended the gymnasium in Gomel, now the Belarusian State University of Transport. In 1915, Sukhoi was admitted to the Imperial Moscow Technical School in Moscow after passing the entrance exams. However, Sukhoi's studies were interrupted when he was drafted into the Imperial Russian Army following the escalation of World War I. 

Sukhoi attended warrant officer training assigned to the artillery of the Russian Western Front. Sukhoi was in the Russian Army when it collapsed after the October Revolution in 1917, returning to Moscow to find his university was closed. Instead, Sukhoi returned to Gomel to live with his parents and was offered a place as a mathematics teacher in the small town of Luninets near Brest-Litovsk. In 1919, Sukhoi fled to Gomel as Polish troops advanced on Luninets during the Polish–Soviet War, and began teaching at the school for the children of railway workers headed by his father. Around this time, Sukhoi contracted typhus and then scarlet fever which significantly affected his ability to speak, and he developed a reputation as a quiet person for the remainder of his life.

In 1920, Sukhoi was finally demobilized from the army because of his health-related problems, and the government of the Russian Soviet Republic issued a resolution to reopen institutions of higher education in Russia. Sukhoi returned to his studies at BMSTU and graduated in 1925 with his thesis titles Single-engined Pursuit Aircraft of 300 hp under the direction of aeronautics pioneer Andrei Tupolev. In March 1925, Sukhoi started working as an engineer and designer with the Central Aerohydrodynamic Institute (TsAGI) and Moscow Factory Number 156 under Tupolev. During the following years, Sukhoi designed and constructed aircraft including the record-setting Tupolev ANT-25 and the TB-1 and TB-3 heavy bombers. In 1932, Sukhoi was appointed head of the engineering and design department of TsAGI, and in 1938 he was promoted to head of the department of design. Sukhoi also developed a multi-purpose light aircraft, the Su-2, which saw service in the early years of the Eastern Front of World War II.

In September 1939, Sukhoi founded an independent engineering and design department named Sukhoi Design Bureau (OKB Sukhoi) located in Kharkiv. Sukhoi was not satisfied with the geographical location of the OKB, which was isolated from the scientific centers of Moscow. Sukhoi insisted that the OKB should relocate to an aerodrome in Moscow Oblast, and by the first half of 1940 the relocation was completed. By the winter of 1942, Sukhoi encountered another problem: since he had no production line of his own, he had nothing to do. Sukhoi had developed a new ground-attack aircraft, the Su-6, but Soviet leader Joseph Stalin decided that this plane should not be put into production, favouring production of the Ilyushin Il-2. 

In the postwar years, Sukhoi was among the first Soviet aircraft designers who led the work on jet aircraft, creating several experimental jet fighters. From 1949, Sukhoi fell out of Stalin's favour and was forced to return to work under Tupolev, this time as Deputy Chief Designer. In 1953, the year of Stalin's death, Sukhoi was permitted to re-establish his own Sukhoi Design Bureau. Sukhoi produced several major serial combat aircraft during the Cold War, including the supersonic Su-7, which became the main Soviet fighter-bomber of the 1960s, and interceptors Su-9 and Su-15, which formed the backbone of the Soviet Air Defence Forces. Sukhoi also pioneered variable-sweep wing aircraft, such as the Su-17 and Su-24. Sukhoi also started a number of projects that were not developed, including the ambitious Mach-3-capable Sukhoi T-3 attack aircraft. From 1958 to 1974, Sukhoi served as a deputy of the Supreme Soviet of the USSR.

Sukhoi died on 15 September 1975 at the Barvikha sanatorium in Moscow, and was buried in the Novodevichy Cemetery. The last fighter Sukhoi designed was the T-10 (Su-27) but he did not live to see it fly.

Awards and honors

 Hero of Socialist Labor (1957, 1965)
 Lenin Prize (1968)
 Stalin Prize, first class (1943)—for the creation of the Su-6
 USSR State Prize (1975—posthumous)
 Three Orders of Lenin (1945, 1957, 1975)
 Order of the October Revolution
 Order of the Badge of Honour (1936)
 Order of the Red Banner of Labour (1938)
 Order of the Red Star (1933)
 Tupolev Gold Medal—For outstanding work in the field of aeronautical science and engineering (1975)

References

Cited sources

Further reading

 Bull, Stephan (2004). Encyclopedia of Military Technology and Innovation. Greenwood. .
 Duffy, Paul (December 1996). Tupolev: The Man and His Aircraft. Society of Automotive Engineers. .
 Gordon, Yefim (2008). Soviet Air Power in World War II. Midland Publishing. .
 Pederson, Jay (1998). International Directory of Company Histories, Vol. 24. St James Press. .

1895 births
1975 deaths
People from Hlybokaye
People from Disnensky Uyezd
Fifth convocation members of the Soviet of the Union
Sixth convocation members of the Soviet of the Union
Seventh convocation members of the Soviet of the Union
Eighth convocation members of the Soviet of the Union
Belarusian engineers
Soviet aerospace engineers
Sukhoi
Bauman Moscow State Technical University alumni
Heroes of Socialist Labour
Recipients of the Order of Lenin
Recipients of the USSR State Prize
Stalin Prize winners
Lenin Prize winners
Burials at Novodevichy Cemetery